Ebrahimabad-e Muri (also Romanized as Ebrāhīmābād-e Mūrī; also known as Ebrāhīmābād) is a village in Darbqazi Rural District, in the Central District of Nishapur County, Razavi Khorasan Province, Iran. At the 2006 census, its population was 169, in 44 families.

References 

Populated places in Nishapur County